Yudelmis Domínguez Masague (born 19 January 1985) is a Cuban professional racing cyclist. She rode at the 2013 and 2015 UCI Track Cycling World Championships. She competed at the 2014 Central American and Caribbean Games in Veracruz, Mexico.

Major results
2013
Copa Cuba de Pista
1st Team Pursuit (with Yumari Gonzalez Valdivieso, Marlies Mejias Garcia and Arlenis Sierra)
3rd Omnium
3rd Scratch Race
2014
Central American and Caribbean Games
1st  Team Pursuit (with Yumari Gonzalez Valdivieso, Marlies Mejias Garcia and Arlenis Sierra)
2nd  Individual Pursuit
2nd  Points Race
2nd  Team Pursuit, Pan American Track Championships (with Yoanka Gonzalez Perez, Yumari Gonzalez Valdivieso and Marlies Mejias Garcia)

References

1985 births
Living people
Cuban female cyclists
Place of birth missing (living people)
Pan American Games medalists in cycling
Pan American Games silver medalists for Cuba
Pan American Games bronze medalists for Cuba
Central American and Caribbean Games gold medalists for Cuba
Central American and Caribbean Games silver medalists for Cuba
Competitors at the 2014 Central American and Caribbean Games
Cyclists at the 2011 Pan American Games
Central American and Caribbean Games medalists in cycling
Medalists at the 2011 Pan American Games
21st-century Cuban women
Competitors at the 2006 Central American and Caribbean Games
Competitors at the 2018 Central American and Caribbean Games